Anordiol, or anordriol, also known as 2α,17α-diethynyl-A-nor-5α-androstane-2β,17β-diol, is a synthetic steroid-like mixed estrogen and antiestrogen and an active metabolite of anordrin, a postcoital contraceptive that is marketed and used in China. Relative to anordrin, anordiol has similar but more potent actions.

References

Ethynyl compounds
Androstanes
Diols
Human drug metabolites
Selective estrogen receptor modulators
Synthetic estrogens